The following is a list of selected United States national rugby union team player statistics.  For additional statistics, see the United States national rugby union team main page.

Most matches as captain

Last updated: USA vs Portugal, 18 November 2022. Statistics include officially capped matches only.

Youngest players

Last updated: USA vs Portugal, 18 November 2022. Statistics include officially capped matches only.

Source: ESPN Scrum

Oldest players

Last updated: USA vs Portugal, 18 November 2022. Statistics include officially capped matches only.

Source: ESPN Scrum

Most points in a match

Last updated: USA vs Portugal, 18 November 2022. Statistics include officially capped matches only.

Source: ESPN Scrum

Most tries in a match

Last updated: USA vs Portugal, 18 November 2022. Statistics include officially capped matches only.

External links
Source: ESPN Scrum

Player